In mathematics, a pseudometric space is a generalization of a metric space in which the distance between two distinct points can be zero. Pseudometric spaces were introduced by Đuro Kurepa in 1934. In the same way as every normed space is a metric space, every seminormed space is a pseudometric space. Because of this analogy the term semimetric space (which has a different meaning in topology) is sometimes used as a synonym, especially in functional analysis.

When a topology is generated using a family of pseudometrics, the space is called a gauge space.

Definition

Symmetry: 
Subadditivity/Triangle inequality: 
Unlike a metric space, points in a pseudometric space need not be distinguishable; that is, one may have  for distinct values

Examples

Any metric space is a pseudometric space. 
Pseudometrics arise naturally in functional analysis.

A seminorm  induces the pseudometric .

Conversely, a homogeneous, translation-invariant pseudometric induces a seminorm.

Pseudometrics also arise in the theory of hyperbolic complex manifolds: see Kobayashi metric. 

Every measure space  can be viewed as a complete pseudometric space by defining  for all  where the triangle denotes symmetric difference.

If  is a function and d2 is a pseudometric on X2, then  gives a pseudometric on X1. If d2 is a metric and f is injective, then d1 is a metric.

Topology

The  is the topology generated by the open balls

which form a basis for the topology. A topological space is said to be a  if the space can be given a pseudometric such that the pseudometric topology coincides with the given topology on the space.

The difference between pseudometrics and metrics is entirely topological. That is, a pseudometric is a metric if and only if the topology it generates is T0 (that is, distinct points are topologically distinguishable).

The definitions of Cauchy sequences and metric completion for metric spaces carry over to pseudometric spaces unchanged.

Metric identification

The vanishing of the pseudometric induces an equivalence relation, called the metric identification, that converts the pseudometric space into a full-fledged metric space. This is done by defining  if .

This is well defined because for any  we have that  and so  and vice versa.

The metric identification preserves the induced topologies. The topological identification is the Kolmogorov quotient.

An example of this construction is the completion of a metric space by its Cauchy sequences.

See also

Notes

References

 
 
 
 
 

Properties of topological spaces
Metric geometry